Ramsden Corner Plantation is a  biological Site of Special Scientific Interest west of Northampton. It is managed by the Wildlife Trust for Bedfordshire, Cambridgeshire and Northamptonshire.

A stream runs through this valley site, which is acidic grassland, woodland and scrub on clay and sand. Plants such as wood millet, wood-sorrel and wood vetch are indicators of ancient woodland. Opposite-leaved golden-saxifrage is found in wet flushes.

The Macmillan Way runs along its southern boundary. There is access from Main Street between Farthingstone and Upper Stowe.

References

Sites of Special Scientific Interest in Northamptonshire
Wildlife Trust for Bedfordshire, Cambridgeshire and Northamptonshire reserves